Kaaway Hanggang Hukay is a 2001 Philippine action film directed by Joey del Rosario. The film stars Phillip Salvador, Ina Raymundo and Edu Manzano.

Cast
 Phillip Salvador as Col. Baltazar Soriano
 Ina Raymundo as Lt. Barbara Veloso
 Edu Manzano as Col. Carlos Ricarte
 Robert Arevalo as Gen. Montoya
 Bob Soler as Col. Ricarte
 Perla Bautista as Mamang
 Denver Razon as Andy
 Dindo Arroyo as Akbar Ahmed
 Paula Gomez as Bianca
 Gamaliel Viray as Sen. Raul Montoya
 Ernie Zarate as Roland Canlas
 Sauro Cotoco as Prime Minister

Production
The film had a working title Ikaw o Ako. The current title was suggested by the late Fernando Poe Jr., who stated that it suits the film's main conflict. Principal photography for the film, which lasted for several months, began while Phillip Salvador was almost done shooting for Pag Oras Mo, Oras Mo Na.

Produced by Ramon Salvador, it was slated to be distributed by Millenium Cinema. However, Millenium closed shop at the start of 2001 while the film was under post-production. Salvador released it to theaters independently in March that year.

Awards

References

External links

2001 films
2001 drama films
Filipino-language films
Philippine action films
Films directed by Joey del Rosario